Poroszló is a village in Heves County,  Northern Hungary Region, Hungary.

Notable people
László Versényi (1931–2016), actor

References

Populated places in Heves County